The  was an earthquake that occurred in Japan at 22:41 JST (13:41 UTC) on October 7, 2021. 
A maximum intensity of Shindo 5+ was recorded, equivalent to VI (Strong) on the Mercalli scale. It was the strongest earthquake to strike the Tokyo area since the 2011 Tohoku earthquake.

Earthquake

Intensity 
A maximum intensity of Shindo 5+ was recorded in the prefectures of Tokyo and Saitama.

Impact

Injuries 
At least 51 people were injured, four of them seriously.

Damages 
Minor damage and power outages were reported in the epicentral area.

Due to the earthquake, transportation such as railroads ceased operations temporarily. Additionally, a Nippori-Toneri Liner train derailed in Adachi, Tokyo. 

There were also reported instances of fires; an oil refinery processing unit was suspended after a fire broke out there.

See also

List of earthquakes in 2021
List of earthquakes in Japan
2012 Chiba earthquake

References 

Chiba
2021 in Japan
Earthquakes in Japan
Chiba_earthquake
2021 disasters in Japan